Adama Ba (Arabic: آدما با; born 27 August 1993) is a Mauritanian professional footballer who plays as a winger.

Club career
In August 2015, Ba joined AJ Auxerre, shortly after being released by SC Bastia.

International career
He was left out of the national team set-up in August 2019.

International goals
Scores and results list Mauritania's goal tally first.

References

External links
 
 
 Adama Ba at TFF

1993 births
Living people
People from Guidimaka Region
Mauritanian people of Malian descent
Mauritanian footballers
Mauritanian expatriate footballers
Mauritania international footballers
Association football midfielders
Ligue 1 players
Ligue 2 players
TFF First League players
Botola players
Stade Brestois 29 players
SC Bastia players
Chamois Niortais F.C. players
AJ Auxerre players
Gaziantep F.K. footballers
Giresunspor footballers
RS Berkane players
People with acquired French citizenship
2019 Africa Cup of Nations players
2021 Africa Cup of Nations players
Expatriate footballers in France
Expatriate footballers in Turkey
Expatriate footballers in Morocco
Mauritanian expatriate sportspeople in Morocco
Expatriate footballers in Greece
Mauritanian expatriate sportspeople in Greece
Mauritanian expatriate sportspeople in Turkey
Mauritanian expatriate sportspeople in France
PAS Lamia 1964 players